Cascavel is a municipality in the state of Paraná in Brazil. It is the fifth most populous city in the state with 332,333 residents, according to IBGE, a government agency. The distance to Curitiba, the state capital, is 491 kilometers by freeway.

Relatively new and with a privileged topography, Cascavel's development was planned, which gives it wide streets and well distributed neighborhoods. With an area of 2,100,831 km2, it is considered a strategic hub of Mercosul.

The city is on a plateau 781 meters above sea level. It is 504 km west of the state capital of Curitiba and 605 km west of the sea port of Paranaguá, 140 km from the three borders (Paraguay, Argentina and Brazil) at 24° 58' South, 53° 26' West.

Toponymy 
The name of the city means rattlesnake in Portuguese; it arises from a variation of the classical Latin "caccabus", meaning "bubbling water boiling". According to legend, a group of settlers camped one night in the region and they were woken by the sound of a rattle; later they realized they set up the camp next to a rattlesnake.

History

Cycle of "erva mate" 
The Caingangue natives inhabited western Paraná, which was occupied by the Spaniards in 1557, when they founded the Ciudad del Real Guayrá, in the current city of Terra Roxa.

A new occupation started in 1730 with troops (troperismo in Portuguese), but the settlement of the current city began in the late 1910s by settlers of mixed racial ethnicity (caboclos (people of indigenous and European descent)), and descendants of Slavic immigrants, at the peak of the cycle of erva mate.

The village began to form on March 28, 1928, when José Silverio de Oliveira, dubbed "Nho Jeca", bought a glebe from the settler Jose Antonio Elias, in the historical area called Encruzilhada dos Gomes, and which is currently the Cascavel Velho neighborhood. It was at a junction of several trails open by ervateiros (cultivators of erva mate), drovers and military, where de Oliveira set up his warehouse. His entrepreneurial spirit was key to the arrival of new people, who brought ideas and investments.

From the 1930s and 1940s, thousands of southern settlers, mostly descendants of Poles, Germans, Italians, Ukrainians and caboclos migrating from coffee regions, began logging, farming and raising pigs in the village, which became a district in 1938.

Notably, the locality was already included in military maps from 1924, and the village was made official by the town hall of Foz do Iguaçu in 1936, with the name of Cascavel. The prelate of that city, Monsignor William Maria Thiletzek, renamed it "Aparecida dos Portos" (a Brazilian name for Mary, The Mother of Jesus), a name that did not prosper amongst the inhabitants.

Cycle of wood 
In the 1930s, with the cycle of erva mate at a close, the surrounding area entered into the so-called "cycle of wood", which attracted a large number of families from Santa Catarina and Rio Grande do Sul. In particular, there were many Polish, German and Italian settlers, who formed the basis of the municipal population.

As the native forests were depleted, the land became available to agriculture sector, which underpins the present-day economy.

In 1938, Cascavel became an administrative district.

Emancipation 
The municipality of Cascavel was emancipated on November 14, 1951, by state law n° 790, separating it from Iguaçu Falls. For decades there was a discussion about whether this would be the proper date, as the installation of the first municipal government occurred only on December 14, 1952. However, in 2010, with the law n° 5.689, the discussion was put to rest.

Development 

As the cycle of timber closed in the late 1970s, industrialization began along with increased agricultural activity and a rising service industry.  In less than six decades, Cascavel went from a rest stop for travelers and trappers, to the largest municipality in western Paraná and one of the largest economic centers in southern Brazil.

List of mayors 

Source: Jornal Hoje

Geography

Climate
Cascavel is a humid city, with a humid subtropical climate (Cfa, according to the Köppen climate classification). The annual average temperature is 21 °C (70 °F), with a maximum of 28° (85 °F). Annual average precipitation is 1965 mm (77.362 inches).

Demographics
According to the IBGE, the population of Cascavel is formed of the following ethnicities

Evolution of the population
The county has experienced significant population growth since its foundation, especially during the first decades.  On the other hand, several municipalities were ultimately removed from Cascavel, which slightly reduced its demographic expansion.

* Variation in the preceding 3 years according to IBGE estimates.

Economy

Cascavel is responsible for 26% of the total production of cereals in the state of Paraná. The main crops are soybeans, wheat, corn, rice, cotton and beans. It is also a big producer of poultry, swine and cattle.

Participation in the municipal GDP:
Livestock raising: 5.95%
Industry: 16.63%
Services: 77.42%

The main industries are food processing, chemicals, metallurgy, and beverages.

It is the terminus of a metre-gauge railway line that goes to the port of Paranaguá.

Transportation

The city is served by Adalberto Mendes da Silva Airport.

Universities 
Cascavel is a very important college center. Besides a state university, in recent years the city became an important student hub centre, with an increasing number of private universities starting their activities in the city.

List of universities 
 Universidade Estadual do Oeste do Paraná
 Universidade Paranaense
 Federal Institute of Paraná - Cascavel campus

Sport
The city is home to the Autódromo Internacional de Cascavel racing track hosting among others the Copa Truck, Stock Car Brasil, Campeonato Brasileiro de Turismo, and the Mercedes-Benz Challenge.

The city is home to one of the top futsal clubs, Cascavel Futsal Clube.

The local association football teams are FC Cascavel and Cascavel Clube Recreativo, in the past there was also Cascavel Esporte Clube. The home of all the teams is the Estádio Olímpico Regional Arnaldo Busatto.

References

External links
Cascavel official website
Tourist points of Cascavel 

 
Populated places established in 1928